, literally common people drama, is a pseudo-Japanese word invented by Western film scholars. It describes a genre of Japanese realist films which focus on the everyday lives of ordinary people. In Japanese the correct word for this genre is shōshimin-eiga (小市民 映画, literally petit-bourgeois film or lower middle class film). 

Film historians Joseph L. Anderson and Donald Richie define the shomin-geki as "[e]ssentially a film about proletarian or lower-middle-class life, about the sometimes humorous, sometimes bitter relations within the family, about the struggle for existence, […] the kind of film many Japanese think of as being about 'you and me.'"

The beginnings of the shomin-geki are assigned to the Shochiku film studio and its director Yasujirō Shimazu. Yasujirō Ozu (1903–1963), a former assistant of Shimazu, and Mikio Naruse (1905–1969) are two prominent directors considered to work primarily in the field of the shomin-geki. Others include Heinosuke Gosho, Keisuke Kinoshita, and occasionally Kenji Mizoguchi.

Terms
 Shomin (庶民) – common people, populace, masses, plebeian 
 Shōshimin (小市民) – petty bourgeois, lower middle class
 Geki (劇) – drama, play
 Eiga (映画) – cinema, film

References

External links
shomin-geki on Cinewiki (Web Archive)

History of film of Japan
Film genres
Mass media portrayals of the working class
Working class in Asia